Driftin' Sands is a 1928 American silent Western film directed by Wallace Fox and starring Bob Steele, Nina Quartero, and William H. Turner.

Cast 
 Bob Steele as 'Driftin' Sands
 Nina Quartero as Nita Aliso
 William H. Turner as Don Roberto Aliso
 Gladden James as Benton
 Jay Morley
 Carl Axzelle

References

External links 
 

1928 films
1928 Western (genre) films
American black-and-white films
Films directed by Wallace Fox
Film Booking Offices of America films
Silent American Western (genre) films
1920s English-language films
1920s American films